Karwan-E-Hayat is a 1935 Urdu/Hindi costume action-adventure film. The film is directed by Premankur Atorthy, with assistance by Hemchandra, for New Theatres Ltd. Calcutta; and it was produced by Lahore branch of New Theatres. The cast included  K. L. Saigal, Rattan Bai, Pahari Sanyal, Rajkumari, Shyama Zutshi, Gul Hamid, Rajkumari, Molina, Shyama Zutshi, Siddiqi, Kapoor and Rana. The cinematographer was Krishna Gopal, with music composed by Mihir Kiran Bhattacharya and his brother Timir Baran Bhattacharya, with lyrics by Hakim Ahmad Shuja Pasha. The film, a costume drama, involved the Prince Pervez on the run from an arranged marriage to a princess, only to fall in love with her when they meet in unusual circumstances.

Plot
Pervez (K. L. Saigal), heir to the throne of Kascand flees from his kingdom when he finds  that his mother (Shyama Zutshi) along with the Wazir (Gul Hamid), has arranged his marriage with the princess (Rajkumari) of Bijapore. Tikkim, wants to marry the princess and he has her kidnapped by the gypsies. Pervez during his escape meets some gypsies who have the kidnapped princess with them. He joins the gypsies and travels with them as a commoner. Zarina (Rattan Bai) one of the gypsy girls falls in love with Pervez. Pervez and the princess find out the truth about each other and fall in love. Together, they defeat the villain Tikkim.

Cast
Cast according to the opening credits of the film
 Saigal as Parvez
 T. R. Rajakumarias Princess of Vijaypore
 Nawab as Emir of Tikkim
 Hamid as Prime Minister
 Shyama Zutshi as Queen Mother
 Pahari Sanyal as Rahat
 Siddiqui as Ajaib
 Kapoor as Suhail
 Nemo as Gypsy Witch
 Ratan Bai as Zarina
 Malina as Sonia

Music
The music of Karwan-E-Hayat has been credited to two music directors, Mihir Kiran Bhattacharya and Timir Baran Bhattacharya, with lyrics by  Hakim Ahmad Shuja Pasha, the famous Urdu poet and writer from Lahore. Some sources credit R. C. Boral for the music as well, but there is no documentary basis for it. Three of the songs in the film were released on 78 rpm records, and all of them are credited to Timir Baran as a composer. The film's booklet mentions only the name of Mihir Kiran Bhattacharya as the composer, but no single song has been specifically attributed to him as such. The definitive information is available from a: Hindi Film Geet Kosh, compiled by Har Mandir Singh 'Hamraaz', b: photos of some labels of the film's 78 rpm records are available at www.kundanlalsaigal.com, c: a book on Saigal named JAB DIL HI TOOT GAYAA.

Songs

References

External links

1935 films
1930s Hindi-language films
Films directed by Premankur Atorthy
1930s historical adventure films
Indian action adventure films
1930s action adventure films
Indian black-and-white films
Indian historical adventure films
Films scored by Mihir Kiran
Films scored by Timir Baran